The 2013 Ginetta Junior Championship was a multi-event, one-make motor racing championship held across England and Scotland. The championship featured a mix of professional motor racing teams and privately funded drivers, aged between 14 and 17, competing in Ginetta G40s that conformed to the technical regulations for the championship. It forms part of the extensive program of support categories built up around the British Touring Car Championship centrepiece.

This season was the seventh Ginetta Junior Championship. The season commenced on 31 March 2013 at Brands Hatch – on the circuit's Indy configuration – and concluded on 13 October 2013 at the same venue, utilising the Grand Prix circuit, after twenty races held at ten meetings, all in support of the 2013 British Touring Car Championship.

Regulation changes
After introducing slick racing tyres in 2012, the championship reverted to treaded road tyres from this season onwards. The switch back was made in effort to cut costs, by saving 75% on the tyre budget.

Teams and drivers

Race calendar and results
The provisional calendar was announced by the British Touring Car Championship organisers on 29 August 2012.

Championship standings

References

External links
 

Ginetta Junior Championship season
Ginetta Junior Championship seasons